Crooked Creek is a tributary of Kitchen Creek in Luzerne County, Pennsylvania, in the United States. The creek is considered to be Class A Wild Trout Waters and a portion of it flows through Ricketts Glen State Park. Wisconsinan Till, Wisconsinan Outwash, and alluvium can be found in its vicinity.

Course
Crooked Creek begins in a pond at the base of North Mountain, just west of the community of Ripple and not far from Ricketts Glen State Park in Fairmount Township. The creek flows southwest for several hundred feet, crossing Pennsylvania Route 118. It then turns west-southwest for more than a mile, its valley gradually deepening. It crosses Bethel Hill Road and receives an unnamed tributary from the left. The creek eventually turns south and after a few tenths of a mile, reaches its confluence with Kitchen Creek.

Hydrology, geography and geology
The concentration of alkalinity in the waters of Crooked Creek is 7 milligrams per liter.

For much of its length, Crooked Creek flows through Wisconsinan Till, Wisconsinan Outwash, and alluvium. Bedrock made of shale and sandstone can also be found in the vicinity of the creek in its lower reaches. The Wisconsinian Till is prevalent in the creek's upper reaches.

Watershed
The creek is in the United States Geological Survey quadrangles of Red Rock and Sweet Valley. Its mouth is in the former and its source is in the latter. The lower and middle reaches of the creek are in Ricketts Glen State Park.

History
Crooked Creek was entered into the Geographic Names Information System on August 2, 1979. Its identifier in the Geographic Names Information System is 1192314.

Biology
Crooked Creek is considered by the Pennsylvania Fish and Boat Commission to be Class A Wild Trout Waters for brook trout. The creek holds this designation for its entire length. The Pennsylvania Fish and Boat Commission describes Class A Wild Trout Waters as being able to "support a population of naturally produced trout of sufficient size and abundance to support a long-term and rewarding sport fishery" and also not being stocked with fish.

See also
Maple Run, next tributary of Kitchen Creek going downstream
Boston Run, next tributary of Kitchen Creek going upstream
List of tributaries of Fishing Creek (North Branch Susquehanna River)

References

Rivers of Luzerne County, Pennsylvania
Tributaries of Fishing Creek (North Branch Susquehanna River)
Rivers of Pennsylvania